The Ellis is a high-rise residential building in Uptown Charlotte, North Carolina. Construction was completed on June 23, 2021. It was developed by Lennar. It is between Eight and Ninth Streets on N College St fronting the Lynx Blue Line. 

The 3.5 acre lot was purchased from Levine Properties in 2017 for $23 million. Previously the property was a surface parking lot. The building aligns with the ongoing project the North Tryon Vision which is working to revitalize a 50 square block area of North Tryon St. Although the project is officially not part of the North Tryon Vision since it's located on North College Street.

Apartment Building 

It consists of 549 apartments in two sections of the building. The primary section is a 6 story low-rise tower with 184 units and the other tower is 33 stories at a height of 384 feet with 365 units. The low rise section has a more eclectic and relaxed feel with rent starting at $1,200 for a studio apartment. The high rise section is more expansive and has refined modern spaces with rents starting at $1,500. 19,000 of ground level retail will also be included. The building is one of the tallest multifamily buildings in the Charlotte area.

The Ellis ran into a number of challenges during construction. The development fills up almost the entire lot so materials could lay around for very long on the lot. This requires a lot of coordination with vendors. Also the building was built during the COVID-19 pandemic which caused a lot of cases of virus transmission among construction workers. The Charlotte Commercial Construction Group developed safety protocols for the Charlotte to prevent the spread of the virus and allow construction work to safely continue. Part of these protocols were nightly cleanings of the construction site and daily worker health screenings.
 
Behind the development will be a private street called Ellis Lane which will front the Charlotte Rail Trail. This street will be used for farmer's markets, food trucks, and "Small Business Saturdays". Other amenities include work from home space, a fitness center, a salt water pool, and a bar overlooking First Ward Park.

A number of organizations are excited to see this building complete Michael Smith, president of Center City Partners, said this "This is a big move as we continue to transform the North Tryon district from many surface lots into a treasured TOD neighborhood". Charles Bowman, North Carolina market president of Bank of America, added "All of you who are a part of it or are going to be a part of it, thank you — if you’re not part of it yet, find another project, bring some capital to town and we’ll put it to work for you". Bank of America and Center City Partners, along a number of other organizations, are a part of the North Tryon Vision.

Homewood Suites Uptown 

As part of the Ellis project the first Homewood Suites in Uptown Charlotte is being built.  It is a 13 story upscale extended stay hotel with 209 suites.  The hotel will also have 4,00 square feet of ground floor retail, 3,500 square  of flexible meeting space, a fitness center, pool, and lounge.  The project is being developed by Concord Hospitality Enterprises Company and Charlotte-based Levine Properties.

See also
List of tallest buildings in Charlotte
List of tallest buildings in North Carolina

References 

Buildings and structures in Charlotte, North Carolina
2021 establishments in North Carolina
Residential buildings completed in 2021
Residential buildings in North Carolina